The American Concession or Settlement was a foreign enclave (a "concession") within present-day Shanghai which existed from around 1848 until its unification with the city's British area to form the Shanghai International Settlement in 1863.

The concession was located north of the Suzhou River and west of the Huangpu River, in what are today parts of Hongkou District and Jing'an District.

History

In 1845, the bishop of the American Episcopal Church W. J. Boone bought an area in Hongkew to create real estates in Shanghai, in the name of building a church. Later Boone proposed to create an American settlement and in 1848, the Shanghai County approved the proposal. On 25 June 1863 American consul George Seward signed an agreement with the head of Shanghai County Huang Fang (黃芳) to create the American Concession in Shanghai, which also confirmed the boundary of area. On 21 September 1863, the American area was merged with the British as the Shanghai International Settlement.

See also
 Shanghai International Settlement
 British Concession (Shanghai)
 Shanghai French Concession
 List of former foreign enclaves in China

References 

Shanghai International Settlement
Concessions in China
Former regions and territories of the United States
American expatriates in Shanghai